David M. McDowell (1963-2014) was an American psychiatrist, author and creative consultant.  He co-founded the Substance Treatment and Research Service at Columbia University and served as its medical director.  He also founded Columbia's Buprenorphine Program, the first such treatment program for opiate addiction in the United States, which according to The New York Times had an 88% success rate.  His scholarly work has focused on co-occurring psychiatric disorders and substance abuse problems, particularly club drugs and marijuana.  McDowell's book Substance Abuse: From Principles to Practice, is one of the more highly regarded and accessible books on the subject, and is excerpted in the American Psychiatric Association's textbook on substance abuse treatment.

Background 
McDowell was born in Haddam, Connecticut.  In 1985 McDowell graduated cum laude from College of the Holy Cross with a Bachelor of Arts and a Master of Arts.  He then attended Columbia University College of Physicians & Surgeons until 1989, interned in medicine at NewYork-Presbyterian Hospital, and did his residency in psychiatry at the College of Physicians & Surgeons.  He is board certified in psychiatry with qualifications in addiction psychiatry by the American Board of Psychiatry and Neurology, and was a visiting clinical fellow at the College of Physicians and Surgeons, and a fellow in the Division of Alcoholism and Substance Abuse at NYU Medical Center.

Career 
In 1995, McDowell joined the faculty of Columbia University's Division on Substance Abuse in the Department of Psychiatry.  He co-founded the school's Substance Treatment and Research Service (STARS) with Herbert Kleber, former Assistant Drug Czar in the George H. W. Bush administration. McDowell acted as the medical director until 2004, and retains a position as senior medical adviser.  In 2004, he founded the Buprenorphine Program at Columbia University, the first such opiate treatment program in the United States.

Recognition 
 2006–2014 - Best Doctors in America, 2006–2014
 2006 - Senior Distinguished Psychiatrist Award, American Psychiatric Association
 1992 - The Secretary of Health and Human Services' Task Force to Link Primary Care, Substance Abuse, and HIV
 1989 - Columbia University College of Physicians and Surgeons Alumni Award for Contributions to the Life of the School
 1989 - American Medical Association Rock Sleyster Scholar for Promise in the Field of Psychiatry
 1989 - Aaron Diamond Human Rights and Medicine Extern, Argentina
 1987-89 - Joseph Collins Scholar for Humanitarian Interest in Medicine

References 

College of the Holy Cross alumni
Columbia University faculty
People from Haddam, Connecticut
2014 deaths
American psychiatrists
1963 births
Columbia University Vagelos College of Physicians and Surgeons alumni